Kalairani Indian actress who has worked in many Tamil films and as a performer with the Koothu-P-Pattarai theatre group.

Filmography

Serials

 Panchavan Kaadu (2014) (Tamil)
 Unarchigal (2014) (Tamil)
 Nandini (2018) (Tamil)

References

External links 

Indian film actresses
Tamil actresses
Indian Tamil people
Living people
Actresses in Tamil cinema
Tamil Nadu State Film Awards winners
Actresses in Telugu cinema
20th-century Indian actresses
21st-century Indian actresses
1963 births